Thorleif Torstensson (26 June 1949 – 10 January 2021) was a Swedish singer, saxophonist and guitarist.

He was the lead singer of the danceband Thorleifs from its inception in 1962. Torstensson along with Thorleifs took part in Melodifestivalen 2009 with the song "Sweet Kissin' in the Moonlight". He took part as a celebrity contestant on Kändisdjungeln which was broadcast on TV4 in 2009.

Torstensson died on 10 January 2021, after a week of care of in a Halmstad hospital, from COVID-19.

References

External links 

1949 births
2021 deaths
Swedish saxophonists
Swedish guitarists
Male guitarists
Deaths from the COVID-19 pandemic in Sweden
Swedish male singers
20th-century saxophonists
Melodifestivalen contestants of 2009